Football is the most popular sport in Saudi Arabia. Football in Saudi Arabia is governed by the Saudi Arabia Football Federation (SAFF). It was founded in 1956. It administers both the club competitions and the national football teams of Saudi Arabia.

The Saudi Arabia Football Federation founder is Prince Abdullah bin Faisal al Saud.

History

National football team

The Saudi Arabia national football team, is nicknamed as Al-Saqour, which means The Falcons. They are one of the most successful football teams in Asia, winning the Asian Championship three times and qualified to the World Cup six times (1994, 1998, 2002, 2006, 2018, and 2022).

Rivalries

Saudi Arabia has a major rivalry with Iran.

League

The Saudi Professional League is the highest level of competition in the country. In the 1970s, football was organized on a regional basis across Saudi Arabia.

In the 1976 Saudi Professional League season, with the improvement of transportation links and local football, the league was launched on a national basis. Eight clubs participated in the first season of the tournament.
 
In 1981, a decision was made by the Saudi Arabia Football Federation to increase the number of clubs to 18 clubs, 8 of which take part in the first league, with the other 10 competing in the second league.

In the 1985 season, the number of clubs in the first league was increased to 12.

In 1990, a league cup was introduced, known as The Custodian of the Two Holy Mosques League Cup. It was a two-stage competition, a round-robin and knockout phase. The top four teams (known as the Golden Square) from the round-robin moved to the knock-out phase to compete for the final championship.

In the 2007–08 season, The Custodian of the Two Holy Mosques Champions Cup was introduced for the more elite teams to compete for. Eight teams participate, including the top six teams of the first league, the winner of the Crown Prince Cup, and the Prince Faisal Cup.

Events hosted
1972 Arabian Gulf Cup
1984 Arab Club Champions Cup
1985 Afro-Asian Cup of Nations
1985 Arab Cup
1985–86 Asian Club Championship
1986 AFC Youth Championship
1986 Asian Club Championship
1987 Arab Club Champions Cup
1988 Arabian Gulf Cup
1989 Arab Cup Winners' Cup
1989 FIFA World Youth Championship
1992 AFC U-17 Championship
1992 FIFA Confederations Cup
1995 Arab Super Cup
1995 FIFA Confederations Cup
1996 Arab Super Cup
1997 Asian Super Cup
1997 FIFA Confederations Cup
1998 Arab Club Champions Cup
1998 Asian Super Cup
1999 Asian Super Cup
2000 Arab Club Champions Cup
2000 Arab Cup Winners' Cup
2000 Asian Super Cup
2001 Asian Super Cup
2002 Arab Unified Club Championship
2002 Arabian Gulf Cup
2002 Asian Super Cup
2005 Islamic Solidarity Games
2008 AFC U-19 Championship
2008 GCC U-23 Championship
2011 Arab Cup U-17
2012 Arab Cup
2014 AFC Champions League Final
2014 Arabian Gulf Cup
2017 AFC Champions League Final
2018 Supercoppa Italiana
2019 AFC Champions League Final
2019 Supercoppa Italiana
2019–20 Supercopa de España
2020 Arab Cup U-20
2021 AFC Champions League Final
2021 WAFF U-15 Championship
2021 WAFF U-23 Championship
2021–22 Supercopa de España
2022 Arab Cup U-20
2022 Supercoppa Italiana
2022 WAFF U-23 Championship
2022–23 Supercopa de España
2027 AFC Asian Cup

National team

National ranking

, Saudi Arabia is placed 49th in the FIFA World Rankings.

Achievements

 1970 Arabian Gulf Cup – Third place
 1972 Arabian Gulf Cup – Runner-up
 1973 AFC Youth Championship – Fourth place
 1974 Arabian Gulf Cup – Runner-up
 1976 Pan Arab Games – Silver
 1979 Arabian Gulf Cup — Third place
 1982 Asian Games – Bronze
 1984 Arabian Gulf Cup – Third place
 1984 AFC Asian Cup – Champion
 1985 Arab Cup – Third place
 1985 Pan Arab Games – Fourth place
 1985 Afro-Asian Cup of Nations – Runner-up
 1985 AFC Youth Championship – Runner-up
 1985 AFC U-16 Championship – Champion
 1986 Arabian Gulf Cup – Third place
 1986 Asian Games – Silver
 1986 AFC Youth Championship – Champion
 1986 AFC U-16 Championship – Third place
 1988 Arabian Gulf Cup – Third place
 1988 AFC Asian Cup – Champion
 1988 AFC U-16 Championship – Champion
 1989 FIFA U-16 World Championship – Champion
 1992 Arabian Gulf Cup – Third place
 1992 AFC Asian Cup – Runner-up
 1992 FIFA Confederations Cup – Runner-up
 1992 Arab Cup – Runner-up
 1992 AFC Youth Championship – Champion
 1992 AFC U-17 Championship – Third place
 1994 Arabian Gulf Cup – Champion
 1996 Arabian Gulf Cup – Third place
 1996 AFC Asian Cup – Champion
 1997 Afro-Asian Cup of Nations – Runner-up
 1998 Arabian Gulf Cup – Runner-up
 1998 Arab Cup – Champion
 1998 AFC Youth Championship – Third place
 1999 FIFA Confederations Cup – Fourth place
 2000 AFC Asian Cup – Runner-up
 2002 Arabian Gulf Cup – Champion
 2002 Arab Cup – Champion
 2002 AFC Youth Championship – Third place
 2003‒04 Arabian Gulf Cup – Champion
 2005 Islamic Solidarity Games – Gold
 2007 Arabian Gulf Cup – Third place
 2007 AFC Asian Cup – Runner-up
 2007 Pan Arab Games – Bronze
 2008 GCC U-23 Championship – Champion
 2009 Arabian Gulf Cup – Runner-up
 2010 Arabian Gulf Cup – Runner-up
 2010 AFC U-19 Championship – Fourth place
 2011 GCC U-23 Championship – Third place
 2011 Arab Cup U-20 – Runner-up
 2011 Arab Cup U-17 – Champion
 2012 Arab Cup U-20 – Runner-up
 2012 Arab Cup – Fourth place
 2012 GCC U-23 Championship – Champion
 2013 AFC U-22 Championship – Runner-up
 2013 GCC U-23 Championship – Runner-up
 2013 Islamic Solidarity Games – Fourth place
 2014 Arabian Gulf Cup – Runner-up
 2014 Arab Cup U-17 – Runner-up
 2015 GCC U-23 Championship – Champion
 2015 GCC U-19 Championship – Fourth place
 2016 GCC U-23 Championship – Champion
 2016 AFC U-19 Championship – Runner-up
 2016 GCC U-19 Championship – Champion
 2018 AFC U-19 Championship – Champion
 2019 Arabian Gulf Cup – Runner-up
 2020 AFC U-23 Championship – Runner-up
 2021 Arab Cup U-20 – Champion
 2021 Islamic Solidarity Games – Runner-up
 2022 AFC U-23 Asian Cup – Champion
 2022 Arab Cup U-20 – Champion
 2022 WAFF U-23 Championship – Champion

Leagues of Saudi Arabia

There are four professional football league levels of Saudi Arabia:
 Saudi Professional League – 16 clubs
 First Division – 20 clubs
 Second Division – 28 clubs
 Third Division – 32 clubs

The Saudi Professional League was ranked 27th in 2015 by the International Federation of Football.

List of Saudi Pro League champions

Performance by club

Stadiums

 Al-Batin Club Stadium
 Al-Bukiryah Club Stadium
 Al-Hazem Club Stadium
 Al Majma'ah Sports City
 Al-Najma Club Stadium
 Al-Okhdood Club Stadium
 Al-Shoulla Club Stadium
 Department of Education Stadium
 King Abdul Aziz Stadium
 King Abdullah Sport City Stadium
 King Abdullah Sports City
 King Fahd International Stadium
 King Fahd Stadium
 King Khalid Sport City Stadium
 King Saud Sport City Stadium
 Mrsool Park
 Prince Abdul Aziz bin Musa'ed Stadium
 Prince Abdullah Al Faisal Stadium
 Prince Abdullah bin Jalawi Stadium
 Prince Faisal bin Fahd Stadium
 Prince Mohamed bin Fahd Stadium
 Prince Mohammed bin Abdul Aziz Stadium
 Prince Mohammed bin Abdullah Al Faisal Stadium
 Prince Saud bin Jalawi Stadium
 Prince Sultan bin Abdul Aziz Stadium
 Prince Turki bin Abdul Aziz Stadium

Best Player of Asia award

League system

The Saudi Arabia football association football league system is organized in a pyramidal shape similar to football league systems in many other countries. The principle of promotion and relegation binds the leagues.

Women's football

Women's football is played in Saudi Arabia, but only in the affluent areas, as the country's very restrictive laws (especially those concerning women) inhibit the practice of the sport. In February 2020, Saudi Arabia launched a football league for women.

Saudi Arabia football privatization

In November 2016, the government of Saudi Arabia approved plans to turn state-owned sports clubs into private companies. This is part of the economic reforms to reduce Saudi reliance on oil exports and ease financial burdens on the government.

References